"Chin Check" is a hip hop song by N.W.A featuring Snoop Dogg. The song is the lead single from the Next Friday soundtrack. The song was also released on The Best of N.W.A: The Strength of Street Knowledge and as a bonus track on the N.W.A Greatest Hits album.

The song is remembered for being a "reunion song" for N.W.A, as it was the first song they performed together since their split and a tribute to member Eazy-E, who had died in 1995. It is also remembered for Ice Cube's pay of respect to his deceased bandmate. In a verse where each member sings the lyric "Fuck that!", they finally put all their previous diss tracks (No Vaseline, Real Niggaz, Fuck Wit Dre Day and Real Muthaphuckkin G's) behind them. The introduction of the song features a woman dialing 9-1-1 for help because four men have broken into her house, only to be violently shot (which is emphasized by what sounds like a shotgun blast).

"Chin Check" marked N.W.A's first and only single since 1991's "The Dayz of Wayback", and their first collaboration with Ice Cube since he left the group in December 1989.

Reception
Vibe gave the song a negative review stating that Dr. Dre's beat was "bland" and that MC Ren and Ice Cube sounded "geriatric" and "lukewarm" respectively.

Charts

References

External links

1999 singles
1999 songs
Friday (franchise) music
N.W.A songs
Snoop Dogg songs
Songs written by Snoop Dogg
Songs written by MC Ren
Songs written by Ice Cube
Songs written by Dr. Dre
Song recordings produced by Dr. Dre